The 2012–13 Towson Tigers men's basketball team represented Towson University during the 2012–13 NCAA Division I men's basketball season. The Tigers, led by second year head coach Pat Skerry, played their home games at the Towson Center and were members of the Colonial Athletic Association. Due to low APR scores, the Tigers were ineligible for post season play, including the CAA Tournament. They finished the season 18–13, 13–5 in CAA play to finish in a tie for second place. This was the Tigers' last season playing home games at the Towson Center as they moved to their new home, Tiger Arena, in 2013–14.

NCAA single season turnaround record
The 2012–13 team's record of 18–13 was a 17.5-game win improvement from the year before, which set the new NCAA Division I record for a single-season turnaround (in 2011–12 they had finished 1–31). The 2002–03 Mercer Bears and 2003–04 UTEP Miners basketball teams had each formerly held the record of 17-game improvements.

Roster

Schedule

|-
!colspan=9| Exhibition

|-
!colspan=9| Regular Season

References

Towson Tigers men's basketball seasons
Towson